Julia Harris may refer to:
 Julia Collier Harris (1885–1967), American writer and journalist
 Julia Wells  or Julia Susannah Harris (1842–1911), Australian botanical collector

See also
 Julie Harris (disambiguation)